Vaygach may refer to

 Vaygach Island, island in the Arctic Sea between the Pechora Sea and the Kara Sea
 Vaygach, Imperial Russian icebreaker built in 1909 that sank in 1918
 Vaygach (nuclear icebreaker), Soviet and later Russian nuclear-powered icebreaker built in 1990